Oscar Daniel Bezerra Schmidt (born February 16, 1958) is a retired Brazilian professional basketball player. He is also commonly known as Oscar Schmidt in Spain, where he played for Fórum Valladolid for the 1993–94 and 1994–95 seasons, and simply Oscar, or Mão Santa (Holy Hand), in his homeland. Schmidt primarily played the shooting guard and small forward position, was 2.06 m (6 ft 9 in) tall and weighed 109 kg (240 lbs). He was born in Natal, Rio Grande do Norte, Brazil.

He is considered to be the all-time leading scorer in the history of basketball, with 49,737 career points scored (pro club league play, plus senior Brazilian national team play combined). He is the record holder for the longest career span of a professional basketball player at 29 years. He is also the top scorer in the history of the Summer Olympic Games, and the top scorer in the history of the FIBA World Cup.

He was named one of FIBA's 50 Greatest Players in 1991. He received the Olympic Order in 1997. On August 20, 2010, Schmidt became a FIBA Hall of Fame player, in recognition of his play in international competitions. On September 8, 2013, Schmidt was inducted into the Naismith Memorial Basketball Hall of Fame. He was inducted into the Italian Basketball Hall of Fame in 2017.

Youth club career
Schmidt played youth club basketball in the youth systems of S.E. Palmeiras and Mackenzie College. With Palmeiras' youth teams, he scored 2,114 points in 85 games, for a scoring average of 24.9 points per game. With Mackenzie's youth teams, he scored 1,332 points in 36 games, for a scoring average of 37.0 points per game.

Professional career

Brazil
Schmidt began his professional club career in 1974, at the age of 16, with the Brazilian Championship club S.E. Palmeiras. As a member of Palmeiras, he won the São Paulo State Championship in 1974, and the Brazilian Championship in 1977.

In 1978, he moved to the Brazilian club E.C. Sírio. As a member of Sírio, Schmidt won the São Paulo State Championship in both 1978 and 1979, and the Brazilian Championship in 1979. With Sírio, he also won the South American Club Championship, and the FIBA Intercontinental Cup title in 1979. He scored 42 points in the 1979 FIBA Intercontinental Cup's Final against the Yugoslav First Federal League club Bosna Sarajevo. Schmidt was the top scorer of the Brazilian Championship in both 1979 and 1980.

In 1982, Schmidt joined the Brazilian club América do Rio. However, he only stayed with the club for a brief amount of time.

JuveCaserta
For the 1982–83 season, Schmidt joined the Italian 2nd Division club JuveCaserta. With JuveCaserta, he played in the first division level Italian League, for the first time in the 1983–84 season. That same season, Schmidt played in a Pan-European club competition for the first time, as he also played in Europe's third-tier level FIBA Korać Cup's 1983–84 season. Schmidt played in Europe's 2nd-tier level competition, the FIBA European Cup Winners' Cup (later renamed to FIBA Saporta Cup), for the first time, in the 1984–85 season.

With JuveCaserta, he won the Italian Cup title in 1988. In the European-wide secondary level 1988–89 FIBA European Cup Winners' Cup's Final, Schmidt scored 44 points against the Spanish club Real Madrid. However, Real Madrid's star player Dražen Petrović, scored 62 points in the same game, and JuveCaserta lost the game, by a score of 117–113.

Schmidt led the Italian top division in scoring six times, while he was a member of JuveCaserta (1983–84, 1984–85, 1985–86, 1986–87, 1988–89, and 1989–90 seasons). JuveCaserta eventually retired Schmidt's #18 jersey.

Pavia
In 1990, Schmidt joined the Italian 2nd Division club Pavia. With Pavia, Schmidt led the Italian 2nd Division in scoring, in both the 1990–91 and 1992–93 seasons. With Pavia, he also led the first division Italian League in scoring, during the 1991–92 season. He was also a member of the FIBA European Selection in 1991.

As a member of Pavia, Schmidt also had his highest scoring single game in the top division Italian League, as he scored 66 points in a 1991–92 season game versus Auxilium Torino, on 30 November 1991. Pavia eventually retired his #11 jersey.

While playing club basketball in Italy, Schmidt earned a fan in future NBA star Kobe Bryant. At that time, Bryant was a young child that was living in Italy, while his father, Joe Bryant, played professional basketball in the country. Bryant called Schmidt one of his childhood idols, and also stated that Schmidt could have been one of the greatest players in the NBA, if he had played in the league.

Overall during his club career in Italy, Schmidt was the Top Scorer of the Italian First Division seven times (1983–84, 1984–85, 1985–86, 1986–87, 1988–89, 1989–90, and 1991–92 seasons). In 2017, Schmidt was inducted into the Italian Basketball Hall of Fame.

Valladolid
In 1993, Schmidt joined the Spanish ACB League club Valladolid. With Valladolid, Schmidt was the Spanish league's top scorer in the 1993–94 season, with a scoring average of 33.3 points per game, in 33 games played (regular season and playoffs). On 19 March 1994, Schmidt made 11 3-point field goals, in a Spanish League game against Murcia.

Schmidt also spent the 1994–95 season with Valladolid. In that season, he averaged 24.0 points per game, in 38 games played. His single-game scoring high in the Spanish League, was in a game that season versus Málaga, in which he scored 47 points, and made all 8 of his 3-point field goal attempts.

In two seasons in the Spanish ACB, Schmidt scored a total of 2,009 points in 71 games played (regular season and playoffs), for a scoring average of 28.3 points per game.

Return to Brazil
Schmidt returned to his native Brazil in 1995, to once again play in the Brazilian Basketball Championship. He was a member of S.C. Corinthians Paulista, from 1995 to 1997. He then played with Grêmio Barueri Bandeirantes / Mackenzie, from 1997 to 1999, and he finished his club career with C.R. Flamengo, where he played from 1999 to 2003.

With Corinthians Paulista, he won the Brazilian Championship in 1996. As a member of Grêmio Barueri Bandeirantes, he won the São Paulo State Championship in 1998. With Grêmio Barueri Bandeirantes, Schmidt, at the age of 39, scored 74 points in a São Paulo State Championship game on 28 November 1997.

As a member of Flamengo, he won the Rio de Janeiro State Championship in 1999 and 2002. Flamengo eventually retired his #14 jersey. Schmidt was the Brazilian Championship's top scorer in each of his last eight seasons playing in the competition (1996, 1997, 1998, 1999, 2000, 2001, 2002, 2003). That was in addition to the two times that he had previously led the same competition in scoring, in 1979 and 1980.

Schmidt retired from his club basketball playing career on May 26, 2003, at the age of 45. During his club playing career, he scored a total of 42,044 points, in 1,289 games played, for a career scoring average of 32.6 points per game. However, those totals do not include all of the games that he played in during his pro club career, as the data for some of the national cup games and Pan-European games that he played in Europe are not available.

NBA draft rights
Schmidt was drafted by the New Jersey Nets in the sixth round of the 1984 NBA draft, and he played with them in their 1984 NBA training camp and preseason. However, he declined the club's offer of a fully guaranteed contract, because it was for considerably less money than he made at the time playing in Italy, and also because to accept the team's contract offer would have meant that he could no longer represent the senior Brazilian national team. That was because until 1989, NBA players were not allowed to play for national teams.

National team career

Junior national team
Schmidt played in the youth systems of Brazil's national federation program. He played in 15 games with the junior selection of São Paulo, with which he scored 393 points in 15 games, for a scoring average of 26.2 points per game. He also played in 31 games with Brazil's national junior selection, in which he scored a total of 569 points, for a scoring average of 18.4 points per game.

Senior national team
With the senior Brazil national team, Schmidt played in five Summer Olympics (he was the second player to do so after Teófilo Cruz) and was the top scorer in three of them. However, he never went past the tournament's quarterfinals. In the 1980 Summer Olympics, he played in seven games and scored 169 points, for a 24.1 average.

He again scored 169 points in seven games in the 1984 Summer Olympics. His best Olympic performance was the 1988 Summer Olympics. At that tournament, he scored 338 points, for an average of 42.3 points per game. In 1992, he scored 198 points in eight games, and in 1996, he scored 219 points in 8 games. In 38 career Olympic basketball games, Schmidt scored a record of 1,093 points, for an average of 28.8 points per game.

Schmidt is also the all-time career leader in total points scored in the FIBA World Cup, having scored a total of 843 points in 33 games, for a scoring average of 25.5 points per game. He won the bronze medal and made the All-Tournament Team at the 1978 FIBA World Cup, and he also made the All-Tournament Teams of both the 1986 FIBA World Cup and the 1990 FIBA World Cup, which he also led in scoring, with an average of 34.6 points per game.

Schmidt played in the gold-medal match of the 1987 Pan American Games, which was held in Indianapolis. The US national team, which was composed of NCAA Division I college basketball players at those games, featured two All-Americans in David Robinson (Hall of Fame member) and Danny Manning, two NCAA Championship Final Four MVPs, in Pervis Ellison and Keith Smart, and other future NBA players, such as Rex Chapman and Dan Majerle. Brazil faced a 68–54 halftime deficit. However, Schmidt finished the game with 46 points, in a 120–115 win for Brazil.

In 1996, at the age of 38, Schmidt retired from playing with the senior Brazilian national team as its all-time leading scorer. While representing Brazil, he scored a total of 7,693 points in 326 games played, for a career scoring average of 23.6 points per game. In 1997, Schmidt was given the Olympic Order award.

Post-athletic career
In 2004, Schmidt started his career in management. He was the CEO of "Telemar Rio de Janeiro", a Brazilian professional basketball team which won the "Campeonato Carioca" (Rio de Janeiro State Championship) in 2004, and the Brazilian Championship in 2005.

In 2006, Schmidt, along with other Brazilian basketball greats such as Paula and Hortência, (another Hall of Fame member), led the NLB: Nossa Liga de Basquete ("our basketball league"), an attempted rival to the Brazilian Basketball Championship. However, the league folded a year later.

Personal life
On May 13, 2013, Schmidt had brain surgery to excise a malignant tumor. At first, nobody knew about it except for his family. The press found out about the disease fifteen days after the surgery, at a dinner celebrating the 50th anniversary of the two-time FIBA World Champion senior men's Brazilian National Team. Schmidt did not appear at the event, as he was recuperating from daily chemotherapy sessions. The disease was later put into remission.

In 2016, Schmidt was one of the guests at the opening ceremony of the 2016 Rio Summer Olympics, alongside other Brazilian celebrities, such as model Gisele Bündchen, actor Gustavo Goulart, and singer Caetano Veloso, among others.

Senior club teams
 S.E. Palmeiras: Brazilian Basketball Championship: 1974–78
 E.C. Sírio: Brazilian Basketball Championship: 1978–82
 América do Rio: Brazilian Basketball Championship: 1982
 JuveCaserta: Italian Second Division: 1982–83
 JuveCaserta: Italian Basketball League: 1983–90
 Pavia: Italian Second Division: 1990–91
 Pavia: Italian Basketball League: 1991–92
 Pavia: Italian Second Division: 1992–93
 Valladolid: Spanish Basketball League: 1993–95
 S.C. Corinthians Paulista: Brazilian Basketball Championship: 1995–97
 Bandeirantes / Mackenzie: Brazilian Basketball Championship: 1997–99
 C.R. Flamengo: Brazilian Basketball Championship: 1999–03

Honors and awards

Summer Olympics Records
 All-time leading points scorer: 1,093 points
 Most total points scored in a tournament: 338 points 
 Highest per game scoring average in a tournament: 42.3 points per game
 Most points scored in a single game: 55 points
 Oldest player to score 40 or more points in a single game: 38 years and 155 days (scored 45 points)
 Tied for most tournament appearances by a men's basketball player: 5 (tied with Teófilo Cruz, Andrew Gaze, Luis Scola, and Juan Carlos Navarro)

Individual
 Considered basketball's unofficial all-time leader in points scored:
 49,737 career total points scored in 1,615 games played (30.8 points per game): 
 42,044 career points scored in 1,289 professional club games played (32.6 points per game).
 7,693 points scored in 326 Brazilian national team games played (23.6 points per game).
 Brazilian national team's all-time leading scorer
 FIBA World Cup's all-time leader in points scored:
 906 career points scored in 34 games played (27.7 points per game)
 1978 FIBA World Championship: All-Tournament Team
 1986 FIBA World Championship: All-Tournament Team
 1990 FIBA World Championship: All-Tournament Team
 1990 FIBA World Championship's Top Scorer (34.6 points per game)
 Summer Olympics's all-time leader in points scored:
 1,093 career points scored – 28.8 points per game
 3× Summer Olympics Top Scorer:
 Seoul 1988 – 42.3 points per game (the record in any edition)
 Barcelona 1992 – 24.8 points per game
 Atlanta 1996 – 27.4 points per game
 Most points scored in a game at the Summer Olympics – 55 against Spain, 24 September 1988 (lost 118–110)
 FIBA Intercontinental Cup Finals Top Scorer (1979)
 7× Italian League Top Scorer: (1984, 1985, 1986, 1987, 1989, 1990, 1992)
 2× Italian 2nd Division Top Scorer (1991, 1993)
 Spanish League Top Scorer: (1994)
 10× Brazilian Championship Top Scorer: (1979, 1980, 1996, 1997, 1998, 1999, 2000, 2001, 2002, 2003)
 He scored 66 points in an Italian League game on 30 November 1991
 He scored 74 points in a São Paulo State Championship game on 28 November 1997
 Retired club jerseys: #18 JuveCaserta (1990), #11 Pavia (1993), #14 C.R. Flamengo (2003)
 FIBA European Selection: (1991)
 FIBA's 50 Greatest Players: (1991)
 Olympic Order: (1997)
 FIBA Hall of Fame inductee: (2010)
 Basketball Hall of Fame: (2013)
 Italian Basketball Hall of Fame: (2017)

As a member of pro club teams
 4× São Paulo State Championship champion: 1974, Sírio 1978, 1979, 1998
 3× Brazilian Championship champion: 1977, 1979, 1996
 South American Club Championship champion: 1979
 FIBA Intercontinental Cup champion: 1979
 Italian Cup winner: 1988
 2× Rio de Janeiro State Championship champion: 1999, 2002

Brazil national team
 3× FIBA South American Championship:  (1977, 1983, 1985)
 FIBA World Cup:  (1978)
 2× FIBA South American Championship: : (1979, 1981)
 Pan American Games:  (1979)
 Pan American Games:  (1987)
 FIBA AmeriCup:  (1989)

See also
List of athletes with the most appearances at Olympic Games

References and notes

External links
Profile at interbasket.com
FIBA Profile
FIBA Hall of Fame Profile
ProBallers.com Profile
Profile at the Brazilian Basketball Federation 
Italian League Profile 
Italian League Stats 
Spanish League Archive Profile 
History of Brazilian basketball 

1958 births
Living people
1986 FIBA World Championship players
1990 FIBA World Championship players
Basketball players at the 1979 Pan American Games
Basketball players at the 1980 Summer Olympics
Basketball players at the 1984 Summer Olympics
Basketball players at the 1987 Pan American Games
Basketball players at the 1988 Summer Olympics
Basketball players at the 1992 Summer Olympics
Basketball players at the 1996 Summer Olympics
Brazilian expatriate basketball people in Spain
Brazilian expatriates in Italy
Brazilian men's basketball players
1978 FIBA World Championship players
1982 FIBA World Championship players
Brazilian people of German descent
CB Valladolid players
Esporte Clube Sírio basketball players
Expatriate basketball people in Italy
FIBA Hall of Fame inductees
Flamengo basketball players
Juvecaserta Basket players
Lega Basket Serie A players
Liga ACB players
Naismith Memorial Basketball Hall of Fame inductees
New Jersey Nets draft picks
Olympic basketball players of Brazil
Pallacanestro Pavia players
Pan American Games bronze medalists for Brazil
Pan American Games gold medalists for Brazil
Pan American Games medalists in basketball
People from Natal, Rio Grande do Norte
Small forwards
Sociedade Esportiva Palmeiras basketball players
Sport Club Corinthians Paulista basketball players
Medalists at the 1979 Pan American Games
Sportspeople from Rio Grande do Norte